The Chicago Central Area Transit Plan, generally referred to as the Chicago Central Area Transit Project (CCATP) in the 1970s, was an extensive study of the rapid transit system in downtown Chicago; the study had begun in 1965.

In April 1968, the completed study resulted in a three-volume report that proposed a series of recommendations for redeveloping and expanding Central Area communities, and for the replacement of The Loop elevated rapid transit system with a new loop subway under Randolph, Franklin, Van Buren, and Wabash, and a new distributor subway system in downtown Chicago (see Chicago "L").

Volume 1 of the three-volume report presented proposals resulting from the study as well as analyses of the various background reports that influenced such proposals. Also included were estimates of usage of the new subway system along with projections of probable economic and social benefits. Aesthetic considerations, construction scheduling and cost estimated were presented.

Volume 2 included detailed preliminary plans, architectural, and engineering drawings, which were to be the basis for construction contracts for the proposed loop and distributor subway systems.

Volume 3 detailed supplemental data gathered during the study phases.

History
Throughout its entire life, the two-mile (3 km), double-track loop elevated in Chicago's central area has coexisted with strong pressures, political and civic, to do away with it in favor of new downtown subways.

The Union Loop Elevated has remained, however, virtually and placidly what it has been since its early days in the late 1890s to the present. Its trackage has been reworked to accommodate changing operational modes. Stations have been added, lengthened, consolidated and eliminated in response to changing riding habits. While no major alterations have been made during its lifetime, minor changes have been made at the stations to improve passenger flow, accessibility, and weather protection. These modifications have added Monel metal and fiberglass to the basic wood and steel construction and have replaced some of the original ornamentation.

The Clark/Lake station was rebuilt from 1988–1992, and several have been replaced with new stations since then [Library-State/Van Buren, Washington/Wells, and Washington/Wabash], in compliance with ADA [Americans with Disabilities Act] requirements.

Since its October 1897 opening, the Union Loop Elevated has provided rail rapid transit service to the Chicago central business district. Its construction permitted the inter-connection of the original elevated railroads, the South Side Elevated, the Lake Street Elevated and the Metropolitan West Side Elevated, and the distribution of passengers around the downtown area. Although development of major high-rise construction went well beyond its physical limits, its presence and configuration originally defined the most prestigious locations for offices and gave the central business district of Chicago its name, the "Loop". For more than 100 years it has served transit riders and has seen the city grow into a major metropolitan region of more than 9,000,000 people. Noisy, awkward, and casting a shadow over the streets in which it runs above, it has become an institution.

From the earliest days when the first elevated railroad was constructed between the Central Area and the South Side in June 1892, the focus of rail rapid transit activity has been the Chicago Loop area. Each net addition to the Elevated system has added to the transportation accessibility of the Loop. The first formal transit plan in Chicago was the Burnham Plan of 1909, which described an extensive rapid transit and streetcar subway system in, and connected to, the central area. Many elements (some transposed with bus service in place of streetcars) are in operation today.

This was followed by various traction plans presented by the City from the early twentieth century through the 1930s, all of which called for a unified system of surface, elevated and subway lines in the Loop.

A Comprehensive Plan for the Extension of the Subway System of the City of Chicago (1939) 
When the State and Milwaukee–Dearborn subways were being constructed between 1938 and 1951, A Comprehensive Plan for the Extension of the Subway System of the City of Chicago was published in October 1939, forming the basis for all subsequent rail rapid transit improvements built through 1960.

The plan also suggested a combination of rail rapid transit and expressway facilities within a common right-of-way. It stressed the fact that the "outstanding flaw in the existing pattern of Chicago's rapid transit system is the complete absence of facilities for north and south crosstown traffic ...", a flaw that exists today. It provided for new subways to be utilized for long-haul traffic, coordinated with surface street feeder and distributor routes within the Central Area. It proposed solutions that would permit the removal of elevated structures in the Loop, thus contributing to the dynamic growth of this area.

New Horizons for Chicago Metropolitan Area (1958) 

The next major step in the development of downtown subways in Chicago came in January 1958, when the Chicago Transit Authority proposed the New Horizons for Chicago's Metropolitan Area, a $315 million, 20-year rapid transit improvement and expansion program to be carried out once financial arrangements had been made. The program was divided into three principal categories:

1. Construction of rapid transit subways and extensions

West Side subway – billed as America's first expressway median rapid transit line, opened June 22, 1958 through March 20, 1960, connecting with the Milwaukee–Dearborn subway and extends west to Des Plaines Avenue, Forest Park. Estimated cost was $41,636,000.
Northwest Rapid Transit – Extension from Logan Square "L" subway route northward between Talman and Rockwell Avenues to the Northwest Expressway and then northwest in expressway right-of-way to a terminal at the City Limits northwest, and in the future, to O'Hare International Airport. Estimated cost, $31,000,000.
South Side Rapid Transit – Construction of a rapid transit route in the South Expressway from 30th Street to 103rd Street on the Calumet branch of the Expressway, and to 119th Street on the Blue Island branch, with a connection to the Englewood "L" branch at 59th Street. Estimated cost, $31,750,000.
Southwest Rapid Transit – Construction of exclusive bus-lanes in the median of the Southwest Expressway from a connection with the South Expressway near Halsted Street and Cermak Road to Cicero Avenue. Estimated cost, $7,000,000.
Wells Street subway – Construction of a new north–south subway through the central business district in Wells Street from a connection with the North Side "L" structure near Chicago Avenue to a connection with the proposed South Expressway median rapid transit line near 30th Street. Estimated cost, $25,000,000.
Jackson Boulevard subway – Construction of an east–west subway in Jackson Boulevard from a connection with the West Side subway near Halsted Street to a terminal loop in Grant Park. Estimated cost, $20,000,000.
Washington Street subway – Construction a bus subway in Washington Street between Canal Street and Michigan Avenue. Estimated cost, $15,000,000.
Lake Street routing via West Side subway – Construction of a connection between the Lake Street rapid transit route and the West Side subway, via Belt Railroad right-of-way adjacent to the railroad embankment. Estimated cost, $3,500,000.
Englewood-Clearing extension – Extension of the Englewood rapid transit branch west from 63rd & Loomis to 63rd & Cicero. Estimated cost, $20,500,000.
California–Western rapid transit – Construction of a rapid transit line in the median of the proposed Cross-town Expressway from a connection with the Northwest Expressway to a connection with the proposed Englewood branch extension. Estimated cost, $14,000,000.

2. Modernization of existing rapid transit facilities

 Loomis station – shortly before the New Horizons plan was published, CTA completed this project, which provided a speed ramp. Approximate cost, $33,000.
 Randolph/Wabash station – around the time of this program, CTA and Marshall Field & Company had completed modernization of this Loop station with a station house and improved lighting. Approximate cost, $40,000.
 Four-track structure through Wilson station area – Construction of two additional tracks in this area to eliminate a bottleneck that severely handicapped train operations. Estimated cost, $1,800,000.
 Signal and train-control systems for unsignaled areas – Signal and train control facilities for a major part of the rapid transit system, which was urgently needed to improve the safety in operations. Estimated cost, $28,000,000.
 Lake Street elevation and extension – Elevation of the ground-level section of the Lake Street rapid transit route between Laramie Avenue, Chicago and Harlem Avenue, Forest Park, using a part of the elevated right-of-way of the Chicago and North Western Railway. Estimated cost, $4,000,000, to be shared as follows: State of Illinois, $1,000,000; Oak Park, $800,000; City of Chicago, $600,000; Cook County, $1,000,000; CTA, $600,000. Future extension to Des Plaines River, estimated cost, $3,500,000.
Forest Park terminal – Construction of yard and terminal facilities at Des Plaines Avenue, Forest Park for West Side subway (completed between 1962 and 1964); included maintenance, transportation buildings and parking facilities. Estimated cost, $4,000,000.
Logan Square terminal – Expansion of the passenger interchange facilities at the former Logan Square terminal of the Northwest Line. Estimated cost, $75,000. This project was completed shortly after the plan was published, but was ultimately demolished in 1969 for the Kennedy Extension.
Howard Street terminal – Construction of off-the-street bus-rapid transit passenger interchange facilities, and a parking lot at Howard Street terminal of the North–South and Evanston rapid transit lines. Estimated cost, $500,000.
Easing sharp curves – Widening or lengthening of sharp curves on the elevated system, which hinders the speed potential of modern rapid transit cars. Estimated cost of eliminating sharp curves, $6,400,000.
Modernization of substations – As reported in the plan, several CTA traction power substations were outmoded and costly to operate and planned to be converted to automatic operation. Estimated cost was $23,152,500.
Ravenswood route grade separation – Elevation of the ground-level section of the Ravenswood rapid transit route, between Rockwell Avenue and the terminal at Kimball & Lawrence. Estimated cost, $4,750,000.
Ravenswood terminal modernization – Extensive modernization of the out-moded Kimball/Lawrence terminal to improve passenger facilities and train operation. Estimated cost, $350,000.
Douglas Park extension and grade separation – Elevated and open-cut grade separation of the ground-level section of the Douglas rapid transit branch, between Keeler Avenue, Chicago, and 56th Avenue, Cicero, and extension westward to Harlem Avenue; construct yard facilities and install signal system. Estimated cost, $20,000,000.

3. Rolling stock required for the extensions

For these proposed extensions and additions to CTA's rapid transit system, an estimated total of $35,500,000 in rolling stock would be required as follows: Northwest rapid transit extension, $7,500,000; Lake Street elevation and extension, $1,000,000; South Side rapid transit, $12,750,000; Southwest bus rapid transit extension, $630,000; Douglas Park elevation and extension, $1,500,000; Englewood-Clearing extension, $3,120,000; and the Crosstown extension, $9,000,000.

Result

The plan of expanded transit facilities would have undoubtedly benefited the whole Chicago metropolitan area. Many of the projects were basically completed, namely the extension of the West Side subway (Congress Line) in the median of the Eisenhower Expressway (in operation June 22, 1958), Lake Street Elevation (in operation October 28, 1962), a part of the Englewood rapid transit extension (to Ashland/63rd, in operation May 6, 1969), the Dan Ryan rapid transit line (in operation September 28, 1969), the Kennedy and O'Hare rapid transit extensions (in operation February 1, 1970, completed September 3, 1984), massive signal and train control system improvements between 1967 and 1976, and the Southwest rapid transit extension, built in the form of the Midway Line (in operation October 31, 1993). 

Rolling stock and equipment improvements were made between 1964 and 1992 with the delivery of the High Performance Generation cars (the 2000-Series, 2200-Series, 2400-Series, 2600-Series, and 3200-Series). Modernization of many traction power substations, and remodeling of several outlying terminal stations were also completed. Some curve straightening projects were also completed such as the 2002-built Harrison Street Curve on the Green and Orange Lines, although most were not.

Only the proposed Wells Street subway and the Jackson Street subway in the Central Area, would have made possible the removal of the Loop and adjacent elevated structures.

Plan for expanding rapid transit service in the central area of Chicago (1962) 
In April 1962, the Chicago Transit Authority proposed replacing the Union Loop Elevated with a downtown subway loop under La Salle Street, Randolph Street, Jackson Street and under the Grant Park parking lot. It was to be connected with major Loop buildings and fringe parking areas around the Central Area and included a rapid transit link to the McCormick Place Convention Center and the proposed rapid transit route in the median of the Dan Ryan Expressway.

Transit Planning Study, Chicago Central Area (1968) 
These proposals and the growing demand for improved public transportation service in the Central Business District led to the Transit Planning Study Chicago Central Area, which began in 1965 and financed through interest-free funds advanced by the Communities Facilities Administration, U.S. Department of Housing and Urban Development (USHUD).

The study was conducted by the City of Chicago, the Chicago Transit Authority, and other public agencies to examine the rapid transit system in downtown Chicago, and develop a plan to maximize the contributions that effective public transportation could make toward the City's economic health. The main objectives were to produce a definitive plan to improve distribution of rapid transit and commuter railroad passengers in the Central Area, to permit removal of the "L" structures in the Loop, and to extend the rapid transit system to sectors of downtown Chicago not presently served – thereby assuring that people working and visiting the Central Area could move about faster, easier, and in a more pleasant environment.

Earlier proposals for transit facilities in the Chicago Central Area were reviewed, new plans were prepared and analyzed, and a recommended Central Area Transit Plan was developed. Loop area development potential was evaluated. Traffic projections were made. Consideration was given to architectural and environmental factors, operational requirements, and potential methods of financing the system. In April 1968 the study had culminated into an exhaustive three volume report recommending the construction of a fifteen-mile (24 km) subway system to replace the old elevated lines in downtown Chicago, naming it the Chicago Central Area Transit Project or CCATP.

The system proposed as a result of the 1968 transit planning study consisted of two major transit facilities:

 An east–west, high-level "shuttle" or "distributor" subway extending from the University of Illinois at Chicago via Monroe Street to two branches serving, respectively, the intensely developing area north of Randolph Street and along and east of Michigan Avenue, and lakefront activities, including McCormick Place and developing areas to the southeast; and
 A conventional subway following a loop pattern under Franklin, Randolph and Van Buren Streets and Wabash Avenue, crossing under the State and Dearborn Street subways. Improved subway connections to the Evanston–Ravenswood and Lake Street Elevated lines, and a connection to the Dan Ryan rapid transit route, and all-weather passageways within the Central Area were included. Implementation of the plan would permit removal of the Union Loop Elevated structures.

Loop subway
The "L" structures in downtown Chicago were to be replaced by subways under Franklin Street, Van Buren Street, Wabash Avenue, and Randolph Street. The proposed loop subway was to be linked to the Dan Ryan branch (then under construction at the time; now part of the Red Line) using the median strip of the proposed (but never built) Franklin Street Extension Expressway from the southwest corner of the Loop (Van Buren/Franklin) to Cermak-Chinatown. The Lake Street "L" (Green Line) was to be replaced from Damen Avenue to the northwest corner of the Loop (Franklin/Randolph) by a new subway under Randolph Street. The Northside "L" which carries Ravenswood (Brown Line) and Evanston Express (Purple Line) trains from Willow Street to the northwest corner of the Loop (Franklin/Randolph) would have been replaced by a new subway under Orleans Street to Division Street, and then northwest along Clybourn Avenue (adjacent to the State Street tubes) to the connection with the existing lines just south of Armitage.

Train service in the new loop subway system were planned to offer the greatest potential in operational flexibility. CTA trains could have been operated on any number of routes, while through service was possible along the entire length of the Franklin Street subway, or to/from Lake Street via Randolph-Wabash-Van Buren. Lake-Dan Ryan (united to form the West-South Route between 1969 and 1993), Ravenswood, and Evanston Express CTA routes were planned to use the new subways. Had the system actually been built when it was proposed between 1969 and 1978, the Midway (Orange) Line would have also utilized the loop subway system through a connection with the Dan Ryan branch in the median of the Franklin Street Extension between Roosevelt Road and 16th Street by the time it began operation in October 1993.  

Stations planned for the loop subway system were to be located at North/Clybourn, Chicago/Orleans, Merchandise Mart, Roosevelt/Franklin, Ashland/Lake, and Canal/Randolph (directly linked to the present-day Ogilvie Transportation Center). The CBD stations under Randolph, Wabash, and Van Buren were to have continuous 28-foot center boarding platforms with station mezzanines either at each cross street or mid-block locations. The CBD stations under Franklin were designed to include double train tubes in a stacked arrangement with continuous side platforms from Jackson to Washington, with station mezzanines also at mid-block locations (Willis Tower was originally planned with basement-level access to the Franklin Street subway during its construction).

Distributor subway

The most novel part of the 1968 transit plan was the distributor subway system. It was to be routed from a terminal at Harrison and Morgan Streets at the University of Illinois at Chicago. From there, the line was to run north to Adams Street paralleling Morgan Street. At Adams Street the alignment was to turn east, meeting Monroe Street at Peoria Street. It would then follow Monroe Street, first under the Chicago River then across the Loop to a station just east of Michigan Avenue.

East of Michigan Avenue the distributor would split – with one branch extending north to Walton Place and the other south to the vicinity of McCormick Place. The latter branch was to consist of two tracks leaving the subway at Adams Street and occupy Illinois Central Railroad right-of-way at grade to the Stevenson Expressway.

The double-track line to the north was to follow an alignment just east of Michigan Avenue under Stetson Street to the Chicago River serving the Prudential Building and the Illinois Center. North of the river, the line would turn north under Fairbanks Court to Chicago Avenue serving the Northwestern Memorial Hospital and the River East area of the Near North Side. Operating counterclockwise, a single track loop was to extend under De Witt Place, Walton Place, Rush Street, and Chicago Avenue to the point of beginning at Fairbanks Court.

Stations planned for the distributor system were to be located at Harrison/Morgan-UIC, Halsted/Monroe, Clinton/Monroe, Franklin to Michigan (12-foot continuous side platforms with mezzanines at each cross street; 3 station stops were to be made at Wells/Monroe, Clark/Monroe, and Wabash/Monroe), Stetson/Randolph, Grand/Fairbanks, Erie/Fairbanks, Chestnut, Hancock, Rush, and Water Tower. The McCormick branch was to serve the Museums and Soldier Field (today's Museum Campus) and McCormick Place Convention Center. 

The Chicago Central Area Transit Plan called for subway construction to start in 1969, with the system opening in stages between 1973 and 1978. According to the 1968 report, the new loop and distributor subways should have carried more than 390,000 passengers on an average weekday, including 152,000 daily passengers using the distributor system. The total daily distributor subway travel by passengers who transferred to or from the commuter railroads (today's Metra and Amtrak) or other CTA rapid transit lines would have been twice these volumes. 

The Chicago Central Area Transit Plan's financial recommendations were, in retrospect, overly optimistic even for those days before the runaway inflation of the late 1960s and 1970s. The projected cost of building the loop and distributor subway systems was $478 million in 1969 dollars. In this and other financial projections, the CCATPS assumed an "escalation" of 5% per year, an unfortunate estimate of the unforeseeable 8–11% inflation rates of the next few years.

The Chicago Urban Transportation District
The Chicago Central Area Transit Project was formally adopted by the City of Chicago as part of the Comprehensive Plan of Chicago. In April 1970, the Chicago City Council passed a resolution authorizing the creation and implementation of the Chicago Urban Transportation District (CUTD). It also defined the boundaries of the District, a  area encompassing downtown Chicago – bounded on the north by North Avenue, on the west by Ashland Avenue, on the south by the Stevenson Expressway, and on the east by Lake Michigan. In June, the CUTD was approved by public referendum with the power to levy taxes to provide the local share of funds for the Chicago Central Area Transit Project, which might have been the seed money for massive Federal assistance, at last, to bury the venerable Union Loop. In July, it was established by Illinois Statute as a separate municipal corporation with taxing powers.

The CUTD was formed for the sole purpose of carrying out the recommendations of the 1968 Central Area Transit Plan. In January 1971, CUTD applied for a $500.4 million grant from the Urban Mass Transportation Administration (UMTA), now the Federal Transit Administration (FTA), to build the loop and distributor subways. With the Central Area Transit Plan now in place, the stage was now set for further frustrations and a series of controversial set backs.

Subway plan on hold
In the early 1970s, while final planning was underway for a start on the new downtown subways, controversy began swirling in the District over the validity of the project and its cost. The 1968 Transit Plan was thought to be "mode restricted" and did not consider alternatives to the steel wheel-on-steel rail mode of rail rapid transit. Rail supporters argued that the "L" system was too extensive to replace with completely new equipment and vehicles, and that passenger volume on the core rail routes exceeded those which could be most efficiently carried by buses.

In 1971, the CCATP was reviewed by local consultants to verify the assumptions and results of the 1968 transit planning study, based on new data then available. The 1968 study was determined to be reasonable, in terms of mode, service pattern, route alignments and station location. The 1971 report also looked beyond the recommended subway plan to possible extensions of the distributor system, and various operating options within the Loop system. It also explored the relationship of the CCATP with downtown parking facilities and the pedestrian passageway system, existing and planned for the Central Business District. The result of this report was a reaffirmation of the 1968 Chicago Central Area Transit Plan.

In 1973, the CUTD retained another consultant, American-Bechtel, Inc., to further review and refine the CCATP, reevaluate the determination of system technology to be used in implementing the project, and conduct the necessary Environmental Impact Analysis of the resulting Transit Plan. This review and refinement was based upon the City of Chicago's community goals and objectives, as expressed in the Comprehensive Plan of Chicago. From this report was other alternative concepts of the plan, put forth by various groups since 1968. Four of these alternatives were selected for further analysis based on the evaluation of alternatives performed for the CUTD by American-Bechtel, which included:

 Alternative 1 – No-build – leave the system as it is.
 Alternative 4 – Replace Loop "L" with east–west distributor (Monroe Line) and north–south (Franklin Line) subways.
 Alternative 6 – Replace Loop "L" with 1968 recommended loop and distributor subways.
 Alternative 12 – Replace Loop "L" with new elevated structures and distributor subway (Clinton–Monroe–Lake Front).

Core Plan
The CUTD remained dormant from 1971 to 1973, and the CCATP was put on hold pending finalization of legality tests and approval of its application for a Technical Studies Grant. Much of the District's resources had been transferred to other programs, including exhaustive and time-consuming validation and alternative analysis reports for the project. In June 1973, the CUTD commenced the first phase of the project, which included design criteria, specifications and general plans for the distributor subway, which was completed in 1974. Federal, state and local funds totaling $8.7 million were used for that eighteen-month effort. Similar predesign work was begun on the Franklin Line portion of the loop subway system, which in turn was completed in 1975.

During this time, the CUTD and the City recommended the realignment of the Evanston–Ravenswood portion of the loop subway system proposed in 1968 for Orleans Street to an alignment under Kingsbury Street and Larrabee Street from the Chicago River to Clybourn Avenue. This alignment was adopted in 1974.

Also, the western terminal for the Monroe Street distributor was rerouted in Desplaines Street from Monroe Street to the Eisenhower Expressway, and then through the existing north portals (which were built in the 1950s) near Halsted Street from whence the Blue Line emerges. Today, those portals remain unused.

Following a public hearing in 1974, the CUTD submitted an Environmental Impact Analysis to the Federal government, and a revised application for a facilities grant for the Chicago Central Area Transit Project. The facilities grant application proposed a ten-year project that would cost $1.642 billion based on an annual escalation of 8% compounded to the mid-year of construction of each segment of the project. The application supported a system alignment made up of the five transit lines; that was used as the basis for the CUTD's presentation at the public hearing. The transit lines selected – generally those recommended in the 1968 Transit Planning Study – were Franklin, Randolph, Wabash-Van Buren, Monroe, Lakefront North and Lakefront South.

Each of the transit lines were examined to determine which segments would provide the earliest return on investment in terms of service to greatest need, and permit early integration into the existing CTA system. The intention was to develop a sequential construction plan that would minimize disruption to urban transportation and stay within available funding.

In the summer of 1974, the CUTD selected a Core Plan, the initial portion of the Chicago Central Area Transit Project to be built. It consisted essentially of the Monroe Line, the Franklin Line, and a portion of the Randolph Line. The Core Plan, which would take about six years to complete and cost $1 billion based on an August 1973 cost estimate, was submitted to the Federal government on August 21, 1974. The Core Plan was received well, however, it was recommended that the project be reduced to $700 million. Modifications to the original Core Plan were made and the revised Plan was presented to UMTA in September 1974.

Subsequently, it was determined locally that certain options originally eliminated due to funding restraints placed on the project be reinstated. UMTA withdrew the cost ceiling, the adjustments were made after extensive interagency studies and conferences and the revised Core Plan was submitted to UMTA in August 1975. It was estimated to cost $1.43 billion and would take six years to design and build.

None of the above actions have changed the Balance of the Project, which consisted of the portion of the Monroe Line to the University of Illinois at Chicago, the Lakefront Line (North and South), and the remaining portion of the Randolph, Wabash and Van Buren Lines. No work was ever started on those elements because they were determined to be subject to more changeable circumstances and potential modification and, therefore, responsive to further study of demand and benefit as part of the continuing planning process.

Concurrent with development of the Core Plan, the CUTD had completed the predesign work needed for the Monroe Line in 1974 and performed similar work on the Franklin Line, which was completed in January 1976. Since September 1974, the CUTD was ready to begin final design and construction on the distributor subway (Monroe Line), but implementation was further delayed.

End of the Loop?
Additional funding constraints were placed upon the Chicago Central Area Transit Project, and the project was scaled down to more modest levels to meet the funding limits. Initially, the Core Plan, consisting essentially of the Franklin and Monroe Lines on specific alignments determined after extensive interagency studies and conferences in 1975 and 1976, was to be built first. Together, the lines of the Core Plan, when constructed, would permit better balanced operations in downtown Chicago and elimination of the Loop "L" structure.

On June 9, 1976, after meeting with the Mayor of Chicago and representatives of all interested City and Regional agencies, a decision was made to separate the CCATP Core Plan into its two main components, the Franklin Line and Monroe Line, in a new implementation plan that introduced certain revisions to reduce the cost of each increment, and build one of them immediately.

While each increment was desirable and viable in itself, and there was no particular cost advantage to either route, overriding and operational factors led to the conclusion that the Franklin Street subway was to be the first increment of the Chicago Central Area Transit Project to be constructed, and the CUTD had adopted that course.

The Franklin Line (CUTD 1978)

The Franklin Line, which was estimated to cost $496 million in 1977, was to extend nearly five miles from approximately Willow Street on the north (Evanston-Ravenswood Lines) to Cermak Road on the south (Englewood-Jackson Park Lines). From north to south, the Line was to follow Clybourn Avenue (parallel to the Red Line subway) to Larrabee Street then follow Larrabee and Kingsbury Streets through a station between the Merchandise Mart and the Apparel Center under Orleans Street. It would cross the Chicago River diagonally then curve under Franklin Street in the Central Business District in a stacked arrangement with stations and two continuous platforms (similar to the Red and Blue Line subways). 

South of the Loop, the line was to follow an alignment along the proposed Franklin Street Connector through a median strip station at Roosevelt Road and then continue south in subway running diagonally to the South Side "L" at 18th and State Streets and its connection near Cermak Road. There was also to be a connection between the Dan Ryan line and the portion of the Franklin Line in the median of the Franklin Street Connector between 15th Street and Cermak-Chinatown station. 

Five stations were proposed along the 4.65 mile subway route at North/Clybourn, Chicago/Larrabee, Merchandise Mart, Washington/Franklin, Monroe/Franklin, Jackson/Franklin, and Roosevelt/Franklin. A sixth station was planned at Division/Larrabee to provide transit access to Goose Island and the former Cabrini Green Housing project as well as other developments planned in the vicinity.

According to the 1978 Draft Environmental Impact Statement (UMTA), construction of the Franklin Line was anticipated to begin in January 1979 and scheduled for completion in December 1983, however, an unexpected delay pushed the construction start time back one year to January 1980, with an estimated opening of the new subway in early 1985 (Chicago-Franklin Line FEIS, UMTA, 1979).

The new subway was designed to offer dual-flexibility in routing rail transit service along the western (Franklin Street) and eastern (State Street) edges of the Loop. It would have created a second CTA North-South through operation — Ravenswood-Englewood/Jackson Park service — with Evanston Express service also routed into the new Franklin Line to a turn-back facility south of the planned Roosevelt/Franklin station. Howard-Dan Ryan (Red Line) service could have been started as early as 1984 or 1985, in lieu of CTA's February 21, 1993 rail system reroute. Lake Street "L" service was to continue operating over the remaining portion of the Union Loop "L" until some time later when financial arrangements permitted construction of the Monroe distributor subway, or at least until the Midway Line was built in 1993. The balance of the project (or the unbuilt segments of the CCATP) would be constructed further into the unforeseeable future.

1977 Chicago Loop derailment

The overall effort to get started on the project acquired a sudden and shocking urgency brought about by one of the most extraordinary accidents in the history of Chicago's rapid transit system, the 1977 Chicago Loop derailment. Shortly after 5:00 p.m. on Friday, February 4, 1977, a Forest Park-bound Lake-Dan Ryan train departed from the Randolph/Wabash station and pulled into the tight,  curve and Lake Street and Wabash Avenue and slammed head-on into the rear of a Ravenswood train at a standstill just beyond the turn. The four lead cars of the eight-car train derailed, two of them plunged into the street below. Eleven passengers were killed and 183 were injured. 

As CTA and City of Chicago crews worked diligently to clear the wreckage, one horribly tense moment was broadcast live on Chicago television. Cranes grappled with and lifted one car that had landed on its side in the street while viewers were held in suspense until word came that no pedestrians were caught beneath the 50,000 pound vehicle. "L" service was restored the next day. There was intense discussion about replacement subways for the Loop "L" for several days immediately following the disaster, which was the only major accident on the Loop in its history.

Even as CUTD staff commenced selecting engineers and contractors for the Franklin Line subway, a murmur of opposition began to be heard in Chicago, voices that questioned the wisdom of replacing the Union Loop "L". These doubters were in no way against mass transportation – rather they felt that the existing "L" structure, with improvement, could be useful for years to come. Then, there are the romantics who liken Chicago's downtown elevated line to what is left of the San Francisco cable-car network. 

Another group, namely the Chicago Chapter of the American Institute of Architects, went even further by trying to equate the elevated structure as one with the Eiffel Tower in Paris. They claimed it would have been a complete, final catastrophe to tear down so glorious an example from the years when man first began to use structural steel to remake the face of the Earth. Some criticized the Chicago Central Area Transit Plan to build new downtown subways to replace the Union Loop "L" as just one more instance of backroom political deals being made at the expense of taxpayers and daily transit riders.

Chicago Central Area Transit Project canceled
In 1979, Chicago mayor Jane M. Byrne and Illinois governor James R. Thompson reached an agreement whereby the Franklin Street subway project, along with the Crosstown Expressway on the West Side, was to be cancelled, the Union Loop Elevated (which by then had been placed on the National Register for Historic Places) retained and improved upon, and rapid transit developments for residential sections of Chicago where improvements were needed. All of the federal grants earmarked for both projects, which had amounted to just over $2 billion, was diverted to fund other transportation programs. 

From these programs came various highway infrastructure projects, plus the O'Hare Extension of the Kennedy Line in 1984, the Howard-Dan Ryan subway link in 1993, and the Midway Line on the Southwest Side, also in 1993. Those funds have since been exhausted. The Chicago Urban Transportation District, which had suffered from a lack of support and funding, was abolished by state legislation in 1984, and the remaining $12 million it had was transferred to the CTA.

Central Area Circulator
A few years after the demise of the Chicago Central Area Transit Project (CCATP), the city was working on plans for new and less expensive transit alternatives for downtown Chicago. The central area had grown well beyond the expectations of the 1968 Transit Planning Study in terms of building development and employment growth. There were still concerns among Chicago's civic leaders that this growth would seriously outpace Chicago's mass transportation systems which had become insubstantial. By the 1980s and 1990s, replacement subways were deemed too expensive and extensions to the existing CTA heavy rail transit system were considered too limited in their benefits. Additional or expanded bus service on overcrowded and badly congested streets was considered impractical.

The Central Area Circulator Project, coordinated by the Metropolitan Planning Council, opted for a light rail plan to enhance connectivity to a larger area of downtown by commuter railroad and rapid transit systems. The proposed system was dubbed the "Central Area Circulator", an eight-mile (13 km) light-rail transit network linking the North Western, Union and Randolph Metra suburban railroad stations to North Michigan Avenue, Streeterville, Navy Pier, the museums, and McCormick Place. The system was to include east–west routes north and south of the Chicago River as well as north–south links on portions of Michigan Avenue and Columbus Drive.

Construction was scheduled to begin after a preliminary engineering phase of the Project in 1993, with operations expected to begin by 1998. The Circulator Project was estimated at $689.4 million when it too was cancelled in 1995 after Illinois Governor Jim Edgar failed to appropriate money for it.

Livability grant
An aspect of a downtown circulator plan was revived when the United States Department of Transportation announced a Livability Program, Urban Circulator Grant to the Chicago Department of Transportation for the "Chicago Central Transitway," a project to establish designated bus priority lanes, bus signal priority, "next bus" information, and bus shelter branding on Madison, Washington, Canal, and Clinton Streets. The city noted that the "project would meet the goals of the Chicago Central Area Action Plan by promoting transit, bicycle use and walking, thereby making the Central Area even more of an attractive place to do business, visit and live.". The project is known as "Loop Link" and broke ground in 2015. It was formerly called Central Loop BRT, because it contains some elements of bus rapid transit (BRT) systems like dedicated bus lanes, stations shared by several routes, level boarding, and traffic signal priority.

Monroe distributor subway
While no additional heavy rail rapid transit subways are planned for Chicago's Central Area because they are still deemed too high in construction costs and limited in their service potential, an east–west, cross-the-Loop rail system to link the Near West Side, Loop, and Near North Side communities, as well as Chicago's Union Station, Ogilvie Transportation Center, and Millennium Station (Metra Electric & South Shore Lines) is very possible. When the Chicago Central Area Transit Project was shelved in 1979, only the Loop replacement portion of the project (The Franklin Line) was deferred. 

The Monroe Street distributor subway was never "officially" cancelled; it remains to this day an active, viable program. Even with the Loop Link BRT in place and no available funding for such an endeavor ($478 million in 1969; around $3.3 billion today) seems likely, the Monroe Street distributor subway (Harrison/Morgan to Walton Place) could provide a more direct link serving the downtown Metra, Amtrak, and NICTD terminal stations (except LaSalle Street Station), and connect with all CTA rapid transit lines on the Loop Elevated, State, and Dearborn subways. It could also provide better rail transportation to the University of Illinois at Chicago, Greektown, Millennium Park, Northwestern Memorial Hospital, Navy Pier, and the North Michigan Avenue business district, as it was originally planned to do.

References
City of Chicago (Ill.), Department of Public Works. Chicago Transit Authority. "Transit Planning Study Chicago Central Area (P-ILL. 3254)." 1968. Chicago. Volume I. Print.

City of Chicago (Ill.). Chicago Urban Transportation District. "Chicago-Franklin Line Rail Rapid Transit Project, Draft Environmental Impact Statement (UMTA, IL-23-2005)." 1978. Chicago. Print.

Transportation in Chicago